Cuffs is a crime drama series depicting the lives of front-line police officers within Brighton and the surrounding area of Sussex serving within the fictional South Sussex Police service. The series aired on BBC One, with episode one first transmitted on 28 October 2015.

On 17 December 2015, the day after the final episode, the BBC confirmed that the show had been cancelled after one series in order to "create space for new shows". The announcement was criticised by many of the actors and a petition was created in an attempt to encourage the BBC to create another series. Attempts, however, were unsuccessful.

Synopsis
The series focuses on the personal lives of the characters, against a backdrop of typical incidents faced by modern front-line police officers and more comedic ones such as hooligans harassing naturists on a nudist beach and reports of 'dog-napping' in a middle-class neighbourhood. The eight-part series was the first police-based drama to be broadcast by the channel since the Holby City spin-off, HolbyBlue was aired in 2007, and it shared the same eight o'clock slot.

Principal cast

Main characters
Ashley Walters as PC Ryan Draper – Jake's partner and Tutor Constable. He is a widower and father of a son and daughter.
Jacob Ifan as PC Jake Vickers – the son of Chief Superintendent Robert Vickers. He is gay and is struggling as a new recruit.
Amanda Abbington as DS Jo Moffat – an investigator who is having an affair with Robert. She is divorced and lives alone with her ageing German Shepherd.  
Peter Sullivan as Chief Superintendent Robert Vickers – Jake's father. His wife is suffering from cancer.
Shaun Dooley as DC Carl Hawkins – a junior investigator originally from Yorkshire. He is married with children and trying for another with his wife. 
Paul Ready as DI Felix Kane – a mysterious and stoic senior investigator with a troubled personal life. 
Alex Carter as PC Lino Moretti – an out-of-shape cop who is proud of his Italian heritage. He is Donna's partner.
Eleanor Matsuura as PC Donna Prager  – Lino's partner, and an authorised Taser officer.

Supporting characters
Karen Bryson as Custody Sgt Melanie Pyke
Bhavna Limbachia as PC Misha Baig – a Muslim police officer stationed at Brighton Central police station. 
Robbie Gee as Inspector Graham Webb, the duty inspector at Brighton Central police station.
Andrew Hawley as Simon Reddington – a lawyer and the duty solicitor at Brighton Central police station who has an attraction to Jake.
Clare Burt as Debbie Vickers – Robert's wife and Jake's mother who is fighting cancer.
Pippa Nixon as Alice Gove – Donna's wife, an artist.

Episodes

Broadcast
Internationally, the series premiered in New Zealand on TV One in January 2016. ABC in Australia later began airing the show in February 2016.

References

External links
 
 

2015 British television series debuts
2015 British television series endings
2010s British crime drama television series
2010s British LGBT-related drama television series
2010s British police procedural television series
2010s British workplace drama television series
BBC crime drama television shows
English-language television shows
Television series by Tiger Aspect Productions
Television shows set in Brighton